This is a list of African-American newspapers that have been published in the state of Massachusetts.  It includes both current and historical newspapers.  

The roots of the African-American press are particularly deep in Massachusetts, dating back well before the Civil War.  The first such newspaper in Massachusetts was the Anti-Slavery Herald in 1838. Notable African-American newspapers in Massachusetts today include the Bay State Banner.

Newspapers

See also 
List of African-American newspapers and media outlets
List of African-American newspapers in Connecticut
List of African-American newspapers in New York
List of African-American newspapers in Rhode Island
List of newspapers in Massachusetts

Works cited

References 

Newspapers
Massachusetts
African-American
African-American newspapers